Bárbara is the title of an Argentine science fiction comic book series written by Ricardo Barreiro and drawn by Juan Zanotto, and the name of its protagonist. It was first published in the magazine Skorpio in 1979  and ended in 1982.

Synopsis
The series is set on Earth after an invasion by an alien humanoid race called the Adri. After an attack that reduces Earth to a primitive state, they send a race of killer robots to the planet's surface, "The Beasts", with the task of enslaving any human survivors.

Bárbara is a member of a subdued tribe living in the area of what was once Buenos Aires, who worships one of the Beasts through human sacrifices.  After Bárbara refuses to submit to the ritual of rape by one of the priests of the cult, she is subsequently expelled.  She manages to survive the perils of the marshy area of the former metropolis and enters into one of the Adri's bases. She then discovers the deception perpetrated on her race, and decides to start a rebellion, called the Great Revolt.

She also receives telepathic powers, which enable her to communicate with plants and animals.  The same capabilities can now be found in the new generation of humans, but even more powerful than hers, and they are instrumental to the final destruction of the alien invaders.

References

1979 establishments in Argentina
Argentine comic strips
Comics characters introduced in 1979
Science fiction comics
Science fiction characters
Post-apocalyptic comics
Fictional Argentine people
1979 comics debuts
1982 comics debuts
Fictional telepaths